Mark Nye (1909–1993) was an Anglican bishop and political prisoner in South Africa during the apartheid era.

Education 
Nye attended the Merchant Taylors' School, Northwood in London after which he went up to St. John's College, Oxford, where he was awarded the Andrew Scholarship 11 June 1928.  He did his theological training at Cuddesdon College.

Clerical career 
Nye was made deacon on 17 December 1933 and ordained priest 23 December 1934.  He served a curacy at St Luke's Church, Kew, 1933-1937.  Nye moved to South Africa and served as rector in three parishes in the Diocese of Kimberley and Kuruman in the period 1937 to 1951. In 1951 Nye moved to the Diocese of Pretoria and was a priest in charge of the Pretoria Native Mission in Lady Selbourne but based at St Augustine's Church in the Pretoria city center. Later he was rector of St Wilfred's, Pretoria.  In 1965 he was appointed as Dean of Pretoria at St Alban's Cathedral.  In 1973 he was consecrated as a bishop and served as suffragan bishop of Pretoria, rector of Christ Church, Pietersburg (now Polokwane and part of the Diocese of St Mark the Evangelist ) and as archdeacon. He retired to Cape Town in 1978, where he continued his priestly ministry until 1987. He died 18 February 1993.

Political imprisonment 
During the 1956 Treason Trial Nye and his family were living in the priest's house of St Augustine's Church, the house was diagonally opposite the Supreme Court (Old Synagogue). The Treason Trialists would take their meals at the family home.

Following the Sharpeville massacre Nye was detained without trial under the Public Safety Act, 1953, he was arrested on 28 March 1960 (along with Colin Lang, John Brink and Leon Levy, Vuyisile Mini); he was held in solitary confinement for three weeks, Nye was released on 31 May 1960.

Family life 
Nye's parents were Charles and Florence, his siblings were Margaret, David, Noelle, Mark, Rene, and  Niel.  Nye married Gabrielle Jacqueline Wanner on 26 April 1954 and they had four children David, Pierre, Claire, Judith. Claire is an Anglican priest.

Notes and references

White South African anti-apartheid activists
1909 births
1993 deaths
Anglican bishops of Pretoria
Deans of Pretoria